Nuorilang Waterfall, also spelled as Norilang Waterfall,  is a waterfall located in the middle of Jiuzhaigou,  Sichuan Province, 2365 meters in elevation, 320 meters wide and 24.5 meters high. It is one of the large calcified waterfalls in China.

In the noun "Nuorilang Waterfall", "Nuorilang" is the transliteration of the Tibetan, which means "majestic and sublime or male god" in Tibetan.

Damaged by an earthquake
After the 2017 Jiuzhaigou earthquake, Nuorilang Waterfall was severely damaged, and it was only left with a trickle of water.

Restoration
As of August 2019, Nuorilang Waterfall has recovered well. At present, it is still the widest waterfall in China.

References

Waterfalls of China
Waterfalls of Asia
Landforms of Sichuan